Pseuduraecha is a genus of longhorn beetles of the subfamily Lamiinae, containing the following species:

 Pseuduraecha punctiventris (Heller, 1926)
 Pseuduraecha sulcaticeps Pic, 1925

References

Lamiini